is a Japanese film director, writer, editor, producer and actor best known for his 2013 movie The Great Passage for which he won best director at the 2013 Japanese Academy Awards.

Personal life
Yuya Ishii won best director at the 2010 Blue Ribbon Awards, and the movie also resulted in his marriage in late 2010 to the lead actress Hikari Mitsushima, a former member of the J-pop group member Folder 5 and actress in such films as Death Note (2006) and Love Exposure (2008). They divorced in 2016.

Filmography

Films
Rebel, Jiro's Love (2006)
Girl Sparks (2007)
Of Monster Mode (2007)
Bare-assed Japan (2007)
To Walk Beside You (2009)
Sawako Decides (2010)
Mitsuko Delivers (2011)
Azemichi no dandi (2011)
The Great Passage (2013)
The Vancouver Asahi (2014)
Our Family (2014)
The Tokyo Night Sky Is Always the Densest Shade of Blue (2017)
Almost a Miracle (2019)
All the Things We Never Said (2020)
The Asian Angel (2021)
A Madder Red (2021)

Television
When a Tree Falls (2018)

Awards

Asian Film Awards
2008 -  Edward Yang New Talent
2018 -  "Best Director" - The Tokyo Night Sky Is Always the Densest Shade of Blue

 Blue Ribbon Awards
2011 -  "Best Director" - Sawako Decides

 Japanese Academy Awards
2013 -  "Best Director" - The Great Passage

 Mainichi Film Award 
2013 -  "Best Director" - The Great Passage

 Kinema Junpo Award
2013 -  "Best Director" - The Great Passage

References

External links 

 'Bare-Assed Japan' (2005) - Edward Yang New Talent at the 2nd Asian Film awards http://www.lovehkfilm.com/panasia/bare_assed_japan.html
 Yuya Ishii marries actress Hikari Mitsushima http://www.tokyograph.com/news/hikari-mitsushima-marries-director-yuya-ishii

Living people
1983 births
People from Saitama Prefecture
Japanese film directors
Japan Academy Prize for Director of the Year winners
Best Director Asian Film Award winners
Japanese editors